The Dutch cricket team toured the United Arab Emirates to play the United Arab Emirates between 21 January and 3 February 2016. The tour consisted of a first-class match two List A games and a Twenty20 International (T20I) match. The T20I match was in preparation for the World Twenty20 in India in March and the Netherlands won the one-off game by 84 runs. The first-class match was part of the 2015–17 ICC Intercontinental Cup and the List A games were part of the 2015–17 ICC World Cricket League Championship.

Squads

T20I series

Only T20I

See also
 Scottish cricket team against the Netherlands in the UAE in 2015–16

References

External links
 Series home at ESPN Cricinfo

2016 in Emirati cricket
2016 in Dutch cricket
International cricket competitions in 2015–16
United Arab Emirates
Dutch 2015